Diffus Design is a design company and consultancy based in Copenhagen, Denmark. It was founded in 2004 by Michel Guglielmi and Hanne-Louise Johannesen as a creative partnership. The Diffus Design team works with a theoretical and practical approach towards art, design, architecture and new media. 

New products are created by the company through sensor technology merged with traditional materials and craft with a design focus based primarily upon intelligent textiles, wearable technology, tangible interfaces, composite materials and interactive installations. Diffus Design is in a close working relationship with other organizations such as Forster Rohner, Inntex and Alexandra Instituttet as well as Delft University of Technology).

Diffus Design also undertakes consultancy and research in the fields of interactive design, intelligent textiles and architecture, as well as product design for global clients within a wide array of industries ranging from industrial production to fashion and infrastructure planning. The company works in partnership with two European Union research projects funded by the Seventh Framework Programme, CREATIF and Light.Touch.Matters.

The Creatif project is based upon the use of smart fabrics. The aim of the project is to design and develop software and a smart fabric printer that can print electronic materials containing inks with interactive capabilities. The consortium consists of three creative partners (Diffus Design, Base Structures and Zaha Hadid Architects)
and four technical and research based partners (University of Southampton, Institut für Textiltechnik Aachen, Grafixoft and Ardeje).

Light.Touch.Matters is a cooperation between product designers, material scientists, and industry. Light.Touch.Matters plans to create smart materials that can sense touch and movement, and respond with light. The base technologies for the Light.Touch.Matters. project are piezo plastics and flexible OLEDs. The consortium consist of 17 partners from 9 EU countries.

Selected projects 
 Eclipse the solar bag
 The Climate Dress
 Wall (E)Motion

Awards 
 2011: –  First prize for the Climate Dress in the Design That Performs contest, hosted by Samsung
 2014: –  The Red Dot Design Award 2014: Product Design. Red Dot is awarded by Design Zentrum Nordrhein Westfalen in Essen, Germany.

Exhibitions 
 2013-2014: "Shifting Paradigms of Identity: Creative Technology and Fashion" at Kent State University Museum, Ohio, USA. 
 2013: Salone Internazionale del Mobile, as part of "DANISHLIVINGRoom", Milano, Italy 
 2013: "Moving Materials" exhibition, Red Dot Design Museum, Essen, Germany
 2013: "Barcelona Fashion Week", 080 Barcelona Fashion, Barcelona, Spain
 2012: "Health Environment Climate"   exhibition at the Danish Royal Opera, Copenhagen, Denmark 
 2011: "Design Act exhibition", Moscow, Russia
 2010: Expo 2010 Shanghai, China

External links

References 

Luxury brands
 
Industrial design
Design companies established in 2004